Gablet  may refer to:

Gablet roof or Dutch gable, a roof with a small gable above a hipped roof
Gablet, a triangular termination to a buttress: see Glossary of architecture